Littlestown Senior High School is a small, rural public high school located in Littlestown, Pennsylvania, United States. It is part of the Littlestown Area School District. In 2013, Littlestown Senior High School enrollment was reported at 605 pupils.

The current (interim) principal is Joel Moran. The school's colors are blue and gold, and the mascot is the Thunderbolt.

Athletics
Throughout the history of Littlestown Senior High School, athletic programs have been emphasized through the years. Current athletic programs of the school include:

Boys
 Baseball
 Basketball
 Cross country 
 Football 
 Outdoor track and field
 Soccer
 Tennis
 Wrestling

Girls
 Basketball
 Cheer
 Cross country
 Field hockey
 Outdoor track and field
 Softball
 Tennis
 Volleyball
 Soccer

References

External links
 Littlestown Senior High's official website
 Littlestown Senior High's official Bolt Boosters (athletics) website
 Littlestown Senior High's official FFA website
 Littlestown Senior High's official Band Boosters website

Public high schools in Pennsylvania
Schools in Adams County, Pennsylvania
Educational institutions established in 1962
1962 establishments in Pennsylvania